Human growth and transformation-dependent protein (HGTD-P), also called E2-induced gene 5 protein (E2IG5), is a protein that in humans is encoded by the FAM162A gene on chromosome 3. This protein promotes intrinsic apoptosis in response to hypoxia via interactions with hypoxia-inducible factor-1α (HIF-1α). As a result, it has been associated with cerebral ischemia, myocardial infarction, and various cancers.

Structure

HGTD-P contains two transmembrane domains that are required for its localization to the mitochondria and induction of cell death.

Function 

HGTD-P localizes to the mitochondria, where it participates in regulation of apoptosis. This localization is aided by the chaperone Hsp90, which is required to stabilize the protein during the transit. HGTD-P primarily acts in response to hypoxia by interacting with HIF-1α, which then triggers apoptotic cascades that result in the release of cytochrome C, induction of mitochondrial permeability transition, and activation of caspase-9 and 3. In neuronal cells, it additionally stimulates mitochondrial release of AIFM1, which then translocates to the nucleus to effect apoptosis, which indicates that it may participate in the caspase-independent apoptotic pathway depending on cell type or organism.

Clinical significance 

Human growth and transformation-dependent protein (HGTD-P) is involved in intrinsic apoptosis. Apoptosis, an ancient Greek word used to describe the "falling off" of petals from flowers or leaves from trees, is a highly regulated, evolutionarily conserved, and energy-requiring process by which activation of specific signaling cascades ultimately leads to cell death. An apoptotic cell undergoes structural changes including cell shrinkage, plasma membrane blebbing, nuclear condensation, and fragmentation of the DNA and nucleus. This is followed by fragmentation into apoptotic bodies that are quickly removed by phagocytes, thereby preventing an inflammatory response. It is a mode of cell death defined by characteristic morphological, biochemical and molecular changes. It was first described as a "shrinkage necrosis", and then this term was replaced by apoptosis to emphasize its role opposite mitosis in tissue kinetics. During apoptosis the cell decrease in size, loose contact with neighboring cells, and loose specialized surface elements such as microvilli and cell-cell junctions. A shift of fluid out of the cells causes cytoplasm condensation, which is followed by convolution of the nuclear and cellular outlines. In later stages of apoptosis the entire cell becomes fragmented, forming a number of plasma membrane-bounded apoptotic bodies which contain nuclear and or cytoplasmic elements. The ultrastructural appearance of necrosis is quite different, the main features being mitochondrial swelling, plasma membrane breakdown and cellular disintegration. Apoptosis occurs in many physiological and pathological processes. It plays an important role during embryonal development as programmed cell death and accompanies a variety of normal involutional processes in which it serves as a mechanism to remove "unwanted" cells.

Due to its involvement in hypoxia, HGTD-P has been implicated in cerebral ischemia and myocardial infarction, as well as numerous cancers, including cervical cancer and gastric cancer. In the case of cervical cancer, HGTD-P is expressed in the early developmental stages and, thus, may prove useful as a diagnostic marker to control the spread of the cancer. Despite its proapoptotic function, HGTD-P has been observed to coordinate with HIF-1α to promote cell growth and proliferation under hypoxic conditions in cervical cancer. In the case of hypoxia-ischemia brain damage, the microRNA agomir, miR-139-5p, attenuates HGTD-P expression and brain damage, and has the therapeutic potential to treat hypoxia-ischemia brain damage.

Interactions 

HGTD-P has been shown to interact with Hsp90 and VDAC. HIF-1α is also known to bind to the hypoxia-responsive element of the HGTD-P gene promoter and induce its transcription.

References 

Genes